Manuela Mucke (born 30 January 1975 in Wittenberg, Sachsen-Anhalt) is a German sprint canoer who competed from the mid-1990s to the mid-2000s (decade). Competing in two Summer Olympics, she won two gold medals in the K-4 500 m event, earning them in 1996 and 2000. For winning a golden medal during the Olympic Gammes 2000 she was decorated by the President of the Federal Republic of Germany Johannes Rau on Febr. 2. 2001 with the Silver Laurel Leaf.

Mucke also won thirteen medals at the ICF Canoe Sprint World Championships with four golds (K-2 1000 m: 2001, K-4 200 m: 1997; K-4 500 m: 1995, 1998), eight silvers (K-2 500 m: 2002, K-2 1000 m: 1999, 2002, 2003; K-4 200 m: 1995, K-4 500 m: 1999, 2001, 2002), and a bronze (K-4 200 m: 2002).

References

1975 births
Canoeists at the 1996 Summer Olympics
Canoeists at the 2000 Summer Olympics
Recipients of the Silver Laurel Leaf
German female canoeists
Living people
Olympic canoeists of Germany
Olympic gold medalists for Germany
Olympic medalists in canoeing
ICF Canoe Sprint World Championships medalists in kayak
Medalists at the 2000 Summer Olympics
Medalists at the 1996 Summer Olympics
People from Wittenberg
Sportspeople from Saxony-Anhalt